Luambwa barb (Enteromius cercops) is a species of cyprinid fish in the genus Enteromius which is found in the Lake Victoria drainage system of Kenya, the Malawa River in and Uganda and the Akagera system of Rwanda.

References

 

Enteromius
Cyprinid fish of Africa
Taxa named by Peter James Palmer Whitehead
Fish described in 1960